The Drechttunnel is an underground motorway tunnel in Netherlands. It connects Dordrecht and Zwijndrecht. The tunnel has 4 tubes including 8 lanes. The tunnel is part of A16. Length of the tunnel is 823m. Construction of the tunnel started in 1961.

Exits near the tunnel 

Immersed tube tunnels in the Netherlands
Road tunnels in the Netherlands
Tunnels in South Holland
Drechtsteden
IJsselmonde (island)
Buildings and structures in Dordrecht
Transport in Dordrecht
Zwijndrecht, Netherlands